Marmorofusus oblitus is a species of sea snail, a marine gastropod mollusc in the family Fasciolariidae, the spindle snails, the tulip snails and their allies.

Description

Distribution
This marine species occurs off La Réunion and Mauritius, Mascarene Islands; Mozambique and northern South Africa?

References

External links
 Reeve L.A. (1847-1848). Monograph of the genus Fusus. In: Conchologia Iconica, vol. 4, pls 1-21 and unpaginated text. L. Reeve & Co., London.
 Hedley C. (1918). A checklist of the marine fauna of New South Wales. Part 1. Journal and Proceedings of the Royal Society of New South Wales. 51: M1-M120
 Lyons W.G. & Snyder M.A. (2019). Reassignments to the genus Marmorofusus Snyder & Lyons, 2014 (Neogastropoda: Fasciolariidae: Fusininae) of species from the Red Sea, Indian Ocean, and southwestern Australia. Zootaxa. 4714(1): 1-64

oblitus
Gastropods described in 1847